Ben Payal (born 8 September 1988) is a Luxembourgish footballer who most recently played as a midfielder for UNA Strassen. He is currently a free agent.

Club career
Payal made his senior debut for Jeunesse Esch in the 2005/2006 season at 17 years of age. He joined Dudelange in summer 2007. After playing for Fola Esch from 2013-2016, he joined UNA Strassen in 2016. He was released by mutual agreement in 2022.

International career
He made his debut for Luxembourg in a September 2006 friendly match against Latvia. He earned 73 caps, scoring no goals.

Honours
Luxembourg National Division: 1
 2008

References

External links
 
 

1988 births
Living people
Luxembourgian footballers
Jeunesse Esch players
F91 Dudelange players
CS Fola Esch players
FC UNA Strassen players
Luxembourg international footballers
Sportspeople from Luxembourg City
Association football defenders